The East Humboldt Range is a mountain range in Elko County, Nevada, United States. It is located along the eastern edge of the upper watershed of the Humboldt River, which flows to the southwest from its source just north of the range. The range reaches a maximum elevation of  atop Hole in the Mountain Peak. Most of the range is included within the Ruby Mountains Ranger District of the Humboldt-Toiyabe National Forest. The range takes its name from the Humboldt River. The name ultimately is derived from the German naturalist Alexander von Humboldt.

To the north are Interstate 80 and the community of Wells, while to the south are Secret Pass, the larger Ruby Range, and Ruby Valley. To the east are Clover Valley and U.S. Route 93, and to the west are Starr Valley and Dennis Flats.

These mountains were formed by a tilted fault-block process, with gradual slopes and valleys to the west and a steep escarpment to the east.  Both sides of the range show extensive evidence of glaciation during recent ice ages, including U-shaped canyons, moraines, and steeply carved granite mountains, cliffs, and cirques.  All of these features can be seen from the  paved road from Wells to scenic Angel Lake.

The center section of this crest includes the range high point, Hole in the Mountain Peak. The southernmost high summit of the range is Humboldt Peak, after which the main crest begins a gradual descent, forming the northeastern slopes of Secret Pass and the eastern side of North Ruby Valley.

The range includes many glacial tarns, including Angel Lake, Smith Lake, Greys Lake, and Winchell Lake to the north, and Lizzie's Basin, Boulder Lakes, and Steele Lake in the central section.

Hiking trails run from Secret Pass up the western side of the range all the way around to Angel Lake, from Angel Lake to nearby Smith Lake, and from a trailhead near Angel Lake down the east side of the range to Winchell Lake and Lizzie's Basin.  Public access is principally found at Angel Lake, a trailhead at the west end of Secret Pass, and via a primitive road at Weeks Canyon/Lizzie's Basin.

See also
 West Humboldt Range

References

External links

 Angel Lake in the East Humboldt Range

 
Mountain ranges of Nevada
Mountain ranges of Elko County, Nevada